Virbia epione is a moth in the family Erebidae. It was described by Herbert Druce in 1911. It is found in Peru, French Guiana and Costa Rica.

References

Moths described in 1911
epione